The Berkeley Sessions is a six-episode HD Canadian television music program produced by Original Spin Media and was broadcast on Bravo! from 2008 to 2009. The Berkeley Sessions was initially created with an eye and ear toward original music, featuring artists that create innovative new sounds in everything from alt-country and blues to jazz, pop, folk and rock n' roll.

The series was taped in front of a live audience at The Berkeley Church in Toronto, Ontario.

Season 1

Joel Plaskett
Sarah Slean
Jon Langford
Kaki King
Pete Elkas
Jim White

References

2008 Canadian television series debuts
2000s Canadian music television series
Television shows filmed in Toronto